The 2012 Asian Water Polo Championship for men and women was held from 24 to 27 January 2012 at the Chiba International General Swimming Center near Tokyo, Japan.

Road to the 2012 Olympics
The winners of this championship (both men and women) qualified directly for the 2012 Olympic Games in London. The second- and third-placed teams (both men and women) were eligible to participate in the World Olympic qualification tournament, held 1–8 April 2012 for men in Edmonton, Alberta, Canada, and 15–22 April for women in Trieste, Italy. However, only the Kazakhstan women's team applied to take part.

Results

Men

Women

References

External links
Official website (Japan Swimming Federation)

Asian Water Polo Championship
Asian Water Polo Championship
Asian Water Polo Championship
International water polo competitions hosted by Japan